Anne Sutherland-Leveson-Gower, Duchess of Sutherland VA (21 April 1829 – 25 November 1888), 1st Countess of Cromartie in her own right and known as the Marchioness of Stafford from 1849 to 1861, was a British peeress.

Early life
Anne Hay-Mackenzie was born on 21 April 1829. She was the only child of John Hay-Mackenzie of Newhall and Cromarty and the former Anne Craig.

Her mother was the third daughter of Sir James Gibson-Craig, 1st Baronet. Her father was the eldest son and heir of Edward Hay-Mackenzie of Newhall and the former Hon. Maria Murray-Mackenzie of Cromartie (eldest daughter and heiress of line of George Murray-Mackenzie, 6th Lord Elibank and Lady Isabella Mackenzie, eldest daughter and heiress of line of George Mackenzie, 3rd Earl of Cromartie, who took part in the Jacobite rising of 1745 and was attainted in 1746). His grandfather was also the younger brother of George Hay, 7th Marquess of Tweeddale.

Countess of Cromartie
On 21 October 1861, the title held by her great-great-grandfather, George Mackenzie, 3rd Earl of Cromartie, was revived when the Duchess of Sutherland was created, in her own right, Baroness Castlehaven, of Castlehaven, Baroness Macleod, of Castle Leod, Viscountess Tarbat, of Tarbat, all in the County of Cromarty, and Countess of Cromartie, all with remainder firstly to Francis Sutherland-Leveson-Gower, her second surviving son, and the heirs male of his body, secondly to each of her younger sons in like manner in priority of birth, thirdly to said Francis Sutherland-Leveson-Gower and the heirs of his body, fourthly to each other her younger sons in like manner in priority of birth, fifthly to her daughter Florence Sutherland-Leveson-Gower and the heirs of her body, and sixthly to each other of her daughters in like manner in priority of birth "provided that if the said Francis Sutherland-Leveson-Gower or any other person taking under the said letters patent shall succeed to the Earldom of Sutherland, and there shall upon or at any time after the occurrence of such event be any other younger son or other daughter of the said Anne, Duchess of Sutherland, or any heir of the body of such other son or daughter, then, and so often as the same may happen, the succession to the honours and dignities thereby created shall devolve on the son or daughter of the said Anne, or their heirs, who would be next entitled to succeed to the said honours if the person so succeeding to the Earldom of Sutherland were dead without issue."

She later served as Mistress of the Robes to Queen Victoria from 1870 to 1874, and was awarded the Order of Victoria and Albert (3rd class).

Personal life

On 27 June 1849 she married George Sutherland-Leveson-Gower, Marquess of Stafford, eldest son of George Sutherland-Leveson-Gower, 2nd Duke of Sutherland. He succeeded as third Duke of Sutherland on 22 February 1861. The Duchess of Sutherland had succeeded to her father's lands in the year of her marriage. Together, they had five children:

 George Granville Sutherland-Leveson-Gower, Earl Gower (1850–1858), who died young.
 Cromartie Sutherland-Leveson-Gower, 4th Duke of Sutherland (1851–1913)
 Francis Mackenzie Sutherland-Leveson-Gower, 2nd Earl of Cromartie (1852–1893)
 Lady Florence Sutherland-Leveson-Gower (1855–1881), who married Henry Chaplin, 1st Viscount Chaplin and had issue.
 Lady Alexandra Sutherland-Leveson-Gower (1866–1891), who died unmarried.

She died at the family's London mansion, Stafford House, St James's, and was buried at Babbacombe Cemetery, Torquay, Devon. On her death in 1888, aged 59, she was succeeded in her earldom according to the special remainder by her younger son Lord Francis. The Duke of Sutherland died in 1892 and was succeeded by their eldest surviving son Cromartie.

References

External links
Anne Sutherland-Levenson-Gower, Duchess of Sutherland (1829-1888) at the National Portrait Gallery, London

Cromartie, Anne Sutherland-Leveson-Gower, Countess of
Sutherland, Anne Sutherland-Leveson-Gower, Duchess of
Sutherland, Anne Sutherland-Leveson-Gower, Duchess of
Sutherland, Anne Sutherland-Leveson-Gower, Duchess of
Hereditary peeresses created by Queen Victoria
Sutherland, Anne Sutherland-Leveson-Gower, Duchess of
Mistresses of the Robes to Queen Victoria
Anne Sutherland-Leveson-Gower, Duchess of Sutherland
Earls of Cromartie (1861)